Ruth Mumbi (born 6 November 1980), is a Kenyan human Rights defender who has dedicated her efforts to the defense of vulnerable women at risk. She was born in Kiamaiko, a Nairobi slum. In 2010, Mumbi founded and led "Warembo Ni Yes," a group of young women committed to ensuring the passage of Kenya's current constitution. As a leader of Bunge la Wamama mashinani, Mumbi has gained recognition for her work as a human rights defender.

In Autumn 2014, Mumbi participated in the human rights fellowship program at the University of York in the United Kingdom.

Mumbi has received several awards for her efforts in human rights advocacy. In 2013, she was nominated and selected as a finalist for the Front Line Award for Human Rights Defenders at Risk.

References

Kenyan human rights activists
1980 births
Living people
Women human rights activists